Marshmello Fortnite Extended Set is the debut mix album by American DJ and record producer Marshmello. It was released on February 2, 2019. This album won the Billboard Music Award for Best Electronic Album in 2020.

Background
Marshmello played a concert for Fortnite in February 2019, an extended version of the set being exclusively released to Apple Music the same month.

Commercial performance
The album topped the US Top Dance/Electronic Albums chart.

It also won the best Dance/Electronic Album at the 2020 Billboard Music Awards.

Track listing

Charts

Weekly charts

Year-end charts

References

2019 remix albums
Fortnite
Marshmello albums